This is a list of recordings of Rigoletto, an 1851 opera by Giuseppe Verdi with an Italian libretto by Francesco Maria Piave based on the 1832 play Le roi s'amuse by Victor Hugo. It was first performed at La Fenice in Venice on 11 March 1851.


Recordings

References
Notes

Sources

External links

Opera discographies
Operas by Giuseppe Verdi